The Barshop Institute for Longevity and Aging Studies is a basic and clinical research institute located on the Texas Research Park Campus of the University of Texas Health Science Center at San Antonio (UTHSCSA). It is a leading institute in the United States in geriatrics research. The Barshop Institute ranks #1 in National Institute on Aging funding among Texas institutions, and is highly ranked in the country in National Institute of Health funding. The scientific director of the institute has been Nicolas Musi, M.D. since September 2013. In 2009, one of the research projects of the institute was announced by Science magazine as one of the top scientific discoveries of the year.

Research

More than 160 faculty members at the University of Texas Health Science Center at San Antonio are actively involved in biomedical and clinical research and educational activities that range from the molecular genetics of aging to issues of health care for the elderly population. Faculty members of the Barshop Institute are internationally known for their research into disease processes associated with aging, such as Alzheimer's disease, cancer, diabetes, Parkinson's disease, and cardiovascular disease. Faculty members have made major scientific inquiries into the molecular regulation of aging and age-related diseases, development of anti-aging interventions, and health care issues of the elderly.

In 2010, the University established the Center for Healthy Aging where Barshop Institute scientists studying the basic biology of aging work with their colleagues in clinical research to coordinate translational, clinical aging research, and geriatrics education across all schools of the Health Science Center.

References

External links
Official link
San Antonio Nathan Shock Center

Gerontology organizations
Biological research institutes in the United States
University of Texas Health Science Center at San Antonio